Craw is an English habitational name that arrived in Britain with Anglo-Saxon tribes.  Residents of the village Cronkshaw in the county of Lancashire adopted Craw as their surname.

List of persons with the surname
 Demas T. Craw (1900–1942), United States Army Air Forces colonel awarded the Medal of Honor for action in World War II
 Garvie Craw (1948–2007), American football player
 Pavel Kravař (–1433), or Paul Craw, Bohemian Hussite emissary burned at the stake
 Charles D. Craw, Retired Naval Chief Petty Officer out of the U.S.S. Sea Robin (SS 407).

References

Surnames